Charles Leslie Stevenson (June 27, 1908 – March 14, 1979) was an American analytic philosopher best known for his work in ethics and aesthetics.

Biography
Stevenson was born on June 27, 1908, in Cincinnati, Ohio. He was educated at Yale, receiving in 1930 a Bachelor of Arts (BA) degree in English literature, at Jesus College, Cambridge, where in 1933 he was awarded a BA degree in moral sciences (philosophy), and at Harvard, getting his Doctor of Philosophy degree there in 1935. While at Cambridge he studied under Ludwig Wittgenstein and G. E. Moore. He was an instructor at Yale University from 1939 to 1944, spending some of that time teaching mathematics to wartime naval recruits. His post was not renewed in 1944 because the department did not approve of his emotivist views.  After a period on a Guggenheim fellowship at Berkeley, Pomona, and Chicago, he was appointed to the University of Michigan where he taught from 1946 to 1977. Among his students was Joel Feinberg.

He gave the most sophisticated defense of emotivism in the post-war period.  In his papers "The Emotive Meaning of Ethical Terms" (1937) and "Persuasive Definitions" (1938), and his book Ethics and Language (1944), he developed a theory of emotive meaning; which he then used to provide a foundation for his theory of a persuasive definition.  He furthermore advanced emotivism as a meta-ethical theory that sharply delineated between cognitive, scientific uses of language (used to state facts and to give reasons, and subject to the laws of science) and non-cognitive uses (used to state feelings and exercise influence).

Stevenson died on March 14, 1979, in Bennington, Vermont.

Contributions to philosophy
Stevenson's work has been seen both as an elaboration upon A. J. Ayer's views and as a representation of one of "two broad types of ethical emotivism." An analytic philosopher, Stevenson suggested in his 1937 essay "The Emotive Meaning of Ethical Terms" that any ethical theory should explain three things: that intelligent disagreement can occur over moral questions, that moral terms like good are "magnetic" in encouraging action, and that the scientific method is insufficient for verifying moral claims. Stevenson's own theory was fully developed in his 1944 book Ethics and Language. In it, he agrees with Ayer that ethical sentences express the speaker's feelings, but he adds that they also have an imperative component intended to change the listener's feelings and that this component is of greater importance. Where Ayer spoke of values, or fundamental psychological inclinations, Stevenson speaks of attitudes, and where Ayer spoke of disagreement of fact, or rational disputes over the application of certain values to a particular case, Stevenson speaks of differences in belief; the concepts are the same. Terminology aside, Stevenson interprets ethical statements according to two patterns of analysis.

First pattern analysis
Under his first pattern of analysis, an ethical statement has two parts: a declaration of the speaker's attitude and an imperative to mirror it, so "'This is good' means I approve of this; do so as well." The first half of the sentence is a proposition, but the imperative half is not, so Stevenson's translation of an ethical sentence remains a noncognitive one.

Imperatives cannot be proved, but they can still be supported so that the listener understands that they are not wholly arbitrary:

The purpose of these supports is to make the listener understand the consequences of the action they are being commanded to do. Once they understand the command's consequences, they can determine whether or not obedience to the command will have desirable results.

Second pattern analysis
Stevenson's second pattern of analysis is used for statements about types of actions, not specific actions. Under this pattern,

In second-pattern analysis, rather than judge an action directly, the speaker is evaluating it according to a general principle. For instance, someone who says "Murder is wrong" might mean "Murder decreases happiness overall"; this is a second-pattern statement which leads to a first-pattern one: "I disapprove of anything which decreases happiness overall. Do so as well."

Methods of argumentation
For Stevenson, moral disagreements may arise from different fundamental attitudes, different moral beliefs about specific cases, or both. The methods of moral argumentation he proposed have been divided into three groups, known as logical, rational psychological and nonrational psychological forms of argumentation.

Logical methods involve efforts to show inconsistencies between a person's fundamental attitudes and their particular moral beliefs. For example, someone who says "Edward is a good person" who has previously said "Edward is a thief" and "No thieves are good people" is guilty of inconsistency until she retracts one of her statements. Similarly, a person who says "Lying is always wrong" might consider lies in some situations to be morally permissible, and if examples of these situations can be given, his view can be shown to be logically inconsistent.

Rational psychological methods examine the facts which relate fundamental attitudes to particular moral beliefs; the goal is not to show that someone has been inconsistent, as with logical methods, but only that they are wrong about the facts which connect their attitudes to their beliefs. To modify the former example, consider the person who holds that all thieves are bad people. If she sees Edward pocket a wallet found in a public place, she may conclude that he is a thief, and there would be no inconsistency between her attitude (that thieves are bad people) and her belief (that Edward is a bad person because he is a thief). However, it may be that Edward recognized the wallet as belonging to a friend, to whom he promptly returned it. Such a revelation would likely change the observer's belief about Edward, and even if it did not, the attempt to reveal such facts would count as a rational psychological form of moral argumentation.

Non-rational psychological methods revolve around language with psychological influence but no necessarily logical connection to the listener's attitudes. Stevenson called the primary such method "'persuasive,' in a somewhat broadened sense", and wrote:

Persuasion may involve the use of particular emotion-laden words, like "democracy" or "dictator", or hypothetical questions like "What if everyone thought the way you do?" or "How would you feel if you were in their shoes?"

Bibliography
 Ethics and Language (1944)
 Facts and Values (1963)

See also
American philosophy
List of American philosophers

References

Sources
 
The Penguin Dictionary of Philosophy, ed. Thomas Mautner. Penguin Putnam Inc.

External links
Philosophy Pages: C. L. Stevenson
Philosophy Pages: Emotivism
Notes by Dr. Doug Portmore on Stevenson's Emotivism

1908 births
1979 deaths
Academics of the University of Cambridge
Alumni of Jesus College, Cambridge
American ethicists
20th-century American philosophers
Philosophers of art
Philosophers of culture
Philosophers of mind
University of Michigan faculty
Analytic philosophers
Yale College alumni
Harvard School of Engineering and Applied Sciences alumni